Tiit Tammsaar (born 7 November 1951 in Rapla) is an Estonian politician. He has been a member of VIII, IX. X and XII Riigikogu. 2003-2004 he was Minister of Rural Affairs

He was a member of the People's Union of Estonia party.

References

Living people
1951 births
People's Union of Estonia politicians
Members of the Riigikogu, 1995–1999
Members of the Riigikogu, 1999–2003
Members of the Riigikogu, 2003–2007
Agriculture ministers of Estonia
Recipients of the Order of the White Star, 4th Class
People from Rapla
Members of the Riigikogu, 2011–2015